Al Gash is a district of Kassala state, Sudan.

References

Districts of Sudan